Arapha may be:
an incorrect name for Anaphe, a genus of moths
an alternative name for Rapha, a minor Biblical figure

See also 
 Arrapha, an ancient city in Mesopotamia
 Arafa